Calvin J. "C.J." Moore (born December 15, 1995) is an American football safety for the Detroit Lions of the National Football League (NFL). He played college football at Ole Miss.

Early life and high school
Moore was born and grew up in Bassfield, Mississippi and attended Bassfield High School. He played both linebacker and quarterback for the Yellowjackets. As a senior, Moore made 32 tackles (four for loss) and 3 interceptions on defense and passed for 1,194 yards and 15 touchdowns, while rushing for 318 yards and 13 touchdowns on offense as Bassfield went 15-1 and won the Class 2A state championship.

College career
Moore was a member of the Ole Miss Rebels for five seasons, playing on special teams and as a reserve defensive back for his first two seasons before missing his junior season due to a torn pectoral muscle in training camp. He became a starter for the Rebels during his redshirt junior, making 51 tackles and leading the team with three interceptions and received the 2018 Chucky Mullins Courage Award. Moore began his redshirt senior season as Ole Miss's starting safety before suffering a second season-ending torn pectoral muscle after five games.

Professional career

Detroit Lions
Moore signed with the Detroit Lions as an undrafted free agent on May 10, 2019. He made his NFL Debut on September 8, 2019 against the Arizona Cardinals, playing exclusively on special teams and making one tackle. Moore played in all 16 of the Lions games with seven tackles during his rookie season.

On March 14, 2022, Moore re-signed with the Lions. He was waived/injured on August 30, 2022 and placed on injured reserve. He was released on September 5.

Houston Texans
On October 18, 2022, Moore signed with the practice squad of the Houston Texans.

Detroit Lions (second stint)
On October 25, 2022, Moore was signed by the Detroit Lions off the Texans practice squad.

On March 18, 2023, Moore re-signed with the Detroit Lions.

Personal
Moore has an identical twin brother, A. J. Moore, who was also a defensive back on the Ole Miss football team and now plays for the Tennessee Titans. They played in the same defensive backfield for the Rebels.

References

External links
Ole Miss bio
Detroit Lions bio

1995 births
Living people
People from Jefferson Davis County, Mississippi
Players of American football from Mississippi
American football cornerbacks
American football safeties
Ole Miss Rebels football players
Detroit Lions players
Houston Texans players
Twin sportspeople